Dennis Howard (born September 10, 1954) is an American politician from Oklahoma that served as the Oklahoma Secretary of Agriculture under former Governor of Oklahoma Frank Keating. Concurrent with his service as Secretary, Howard served as the Oklahoma Commissioner of Agriculture. Howard served as both Agriculture Secretary and Agriculture Commissioner for the entire term of Governor Keating, from 1995 to 2003.

Biography
Originally from Waurika, Oklahoma, Howard earned a bachelor's degree in public administration and a master's degree in rural adult education from Oklahoma State University. Prior to his appointment as Agriculture Secretary by Keating, Howard served as Director of Public Affairs for Republican Congressman Frank Lucas since 1994. Before working for Congressman Lucas, he served as Director of Governmental Relations for the Oklahoma Farm Bureau from 1988 to 1994.  He currently is employed in the Langston University Agriculture Department.

References

External links
Budget Limits Hiring in Governor's Office

1954 births
Living people
People from Waurika, Oklahoma
State cabinet secretaries of Oklahoma
Heads of Oklahoma state agencies
20th-century American politicians
21st-century American politicians
Langston University faculty
Oklahoma State University alumni